Colleges in Pala are affiliated to the Mahatma Gandhi University, Kottayam. Many institutions are run under the management of the Diocese of Pala. The following are the educational institutions in the locality:

Colleges

 
Proposed: Indian Institute of Information Technology, Indian Institute of Hotel Management and Catering Technology, Mar Sleeba Medical College

Schools
Infant Jesus Public School Mangalaram (CBSE)

Training institutes
 Brilliant Study Centre, Pala
 Goodwill Institute of Technology, Pala
 St. Thomas Teacher Training College, Pala
 St. Thomas Teacher Training Institute
 Cherian J Kappen Memorial Industrial Training Institute
 P value solution for data science and business analytics

Coaching centers
 Brilliant Study Centre, established in 1984, provides coaching for Medical and Engineering Entrance Examination
 Goodwill Institute of Technology, pioneer skill development institution, located in the heart of Pala
 T.I.M.E. Institute Pala, classroom based medical and engineering coaching institute
 The Civil Service Institute, founded in January, 1998, sponsored by the Archdiocese of Changanacherry and the dioceses of Palai and Kanjirappally as a part of the Inter-diocesan Centre for Human Resources Developmenm
 Mohans Institute of Corporate Studies (MICS), provides Chartered Accountancy (CA) and Company Secretaryship (CS) courses; classes are taught by company secretaries and chartered accountants
 Lumen Study Centre: St. Thomas College Palai, provides a coaching Center for Medical and Engineering Entrance Examination run by St. Thomas College Management
 Talent Academy Pala, provides classes and preparation techniques for AIEEE, JEE-IIT Kerala state medical/engineering examinations
 Thoppans' Swimming Academy, owned and operated by Thoppil brothers

Notable alumni 

 International volleyball player Jimmy George was an alumnus of St. Thomas College.
 Olympian Shiny Wilson is an alumnus of Alphonsa College.

References

Education in Pala, Kerala
educational institutions in Pala